Darbagh (also Romanized as Darbāgh and Dar Bāgh) is a village in Band-e Zarak Rural District, in the Central District of Minab County, Hormozgan Province, Iran. At the 2006 census, its population was 95, in 24 families.

References 

Populated places in Minab County